Yves Simoneau (born October 28, 1955) is a Canadian film and television director.

Simoneau was born in Quebec City, Quebec.

Recognition
His acclaimed 1986 crime drama Intimate Power (Pouvoir intime) garnered multiple Genie Awards nominations including best direction at the 8th Genie Awards. His 1987 film Les fous de bassan was entered into the 37th Berlin International Film Festival.

In 2007 he directed the Movie Bury My Heart at Wounded Knee. It received 17 Emmy Award nominations, the most of any show at The 59th Emmy Awards held in September 2007. It went on to win five awards including the Emmy for Outstanding Made For Television Movie.

Filmography

Features
Les tailleurs de pierre (Short film, 1978)
Commission d'enquête (Short film, 1978)
Québec on the Sunny Side (Short film, 1978)
Les célébrations (1979)
Dernier voyage (Short film, 1980)
Bonjour le Québec (Documentary short, 1980)
Le phénomène des guérisseurs au Québec (Documentary short, 1980)
L'enquête (Short film, 1980)
Le génie de l'instant (Short film, 1982)
Les yeux rouges (1982)
Pourquoi l'étrange Monsieur Zolock s'intéressait-il tant à la bande dessinée? (Documentary, 1983)
Trouble (Short film, 1985)
Intimate Power (Pouvoir intime) (1986)
In the Shadow of the Wind (Les fous de bassan) (1987)
In the Belly of the Dragon (Dans le ventre du dragon) (1989)
Perfectly Normal (1990)
Mother's Boys (1993)
Free Money (1998)
Ignition (2001)
L'appât (2010)

Television
Memphis (TV movie, 1992)
Till Death Do Us Part (TV movie, 1992)
Cruel Doubt (TV movie, 1992)
Amelia Earhart: The Final Flight (TV movie, 1994)
Dead Man's Walk (TV miniseries, 1996)
Intensity (TV movie, 1997)
36 Hours to Die (TV movie, 1999)
Nuremberg (TV miniseries, 2000)
Night Visions (TV series, 2001)
Napoléon (TV miniseries, 2002)
44 Minutes: The North Hollywood Shoot-Out (TV movie, 2003)
The 4400 (TV series, 2004)
Marie-Antoinette (TV movie, 2006)
Ruffian (TV movie, 2007)
Bury My Heart at Wounded Knee (TV movie, 2007)
V (TV series, 2009)
America (TV movie, 2009)
Assassin's Creed: Lineage (TV miniseries, 2009)
Matadors (TV movie, 2010)
Partners (TV movie, 2011)
Beauty and the Beast (TV movie, 2012) 
Betty & Coretta (TV movie, 2013)
Horizon (TV movie, 2013)
The Brave (TV series, 2017)
The Lost Wife of Robert Durst (TV movie, 2018)

References

External links
 

1955 births
Canadian television directors
French Quebecers
Living people
People from Quebec City
Film directors from Quebec
Directors Guild of America Award winners